Ogata Station is the name of two train stations in Japan:

 Ogata Station (Akita) (小ヶ田駅)
 Ogata Station (Oita) (緒方駅)

See also
Ōgata Station, train station in Higashi-ku, Niigata, Niigata Prefecture, Japan